Stephen Clapp (November 27, 1939 – January 26, 2014) was a violinist and Dean Emeritus of the Juilliard School.

Education
Clapp earned the B.M degree from the Oberlin Conservatory and the M.S. degree from the Juilliard School. He was a student of Dorothy DeLay, Ivan Galamian, and  Andor Toth. He studied chamber music with Claus Adam, Robert Mann, Felix Galimir, Raphael Hillyer, Louis Persinger, and Walter Trampler.

Performance 
 
As a member of the Beaux-Arts String Quartet, Clapp won the first Naumburg Chamber Music Award. He won the Josef Gingold Prize of the Cleveland Society for Strings while a student at the Oberlin Conservatory. Clapp was concertmaster of the Aspen Chamber Symphony, Nashville Symphony,  and the Austin Symphony Orchestra.

Clapp performed in numerous summer festivals in Europe and North America. He was a founding faculty member of Credo Chamber Music, at Oberlin Conservatory.  He was first violinist in the Blair String Quartet from 1967-72.

In 1982, Clapp was the founding violinist of the Oberlin Trio, along with cellist Andor Toth Jr. and pianist Joseph Schwartz.

On April 28, 1985, Tim Page (music critic) of the New York Times had this to say about Clapps's playing in a New York debut recital: "Mr. Clapp, who was ably accompanied by the pianist Frances Walker, plays sweetly and songfully, with innate taste; he produces a dark, affecting tone from his instrument, which sounded almost like a viola at times.  . . . a vigorous interpretation, which it received Sunday."

Teaching
Clapp taught violin at a number of schools.
 Aspen Music Festival and School, 1971–94
 Peabody College, Nashville, TN), 1967–72
 University of Texas at Austin, TX, 1972–79
 Oberlin Conservatory, 1978–90
 The Juilliard School, 1987–2014
  Credo Music  1999-2013

Selected discography 
 Leon Kirchner Piano Trio, performed by the Oberlin Trio
 20th-century American Piano Trios 
 French Trios  - Maurice Ravel, Jean Baptiste Loeillet of Ghent, Claude Debussy

References

External links 
 Stephen Clapp, violin
  Juilliard Biography
  Official Biography, PDF file
  Violinists who studied with Stephen Clapp
  Stephen Clapp on "flickr" speaking at Ball State University

Violin pedagogues
American classical violinists
Male classical violinists
American male violinists
Aspen Music Festival and School faculty
Concertmasters
American music educators
Oberlin Conservatory of Music alumni
Juilliard School alumni
1939 births
2014 deaths
Place of birth missing
20th-century classical violinists
20th-century American male musicians
20th-century American violinists